Live In Tokyo is a live recording of the Thad Jones/Mel Lewis Jazz Orchestra made in Tokyo, Japan, in 1974.

Track listing
 "Once Around" – 10:56
 "Back Bone" – 9:43
 "Mean What You Say" – 12:40
 "Little Pixie" – 10:43

Personnel
 Thad Jones – flugelhorn
 Mel Lewis – drums
 Roland Hanna – piano
 George Mraz – bass
 Jerry Dodgion – alto saxophone, flute
 Eddie Xiques – alto saxophone, clarinet
 Billy Harper – tenor saxophone
 Ron Bridgewater – tenor saxophone, clarinet
 Pepper Adams – baritone saxophone
 Jon Faddis – trumpet
 Jim Bossy – trumpet
 Steve Furtado – trumpet
 Cecil Bridgewater – trumpet
 Jimmy Knepper – trombone
 Quentin Jackson – trombone
 Billy Campbell – trombone
 Cliff Heather – trombone

References

 Denon Jazz YX-7557-ND

1974 live albums
The Thad Jones/Mel Lewis Orchestra live albums